St. Wendel is an unincorporated community in St. Wendel Township, Stearns County, Minnesota, United States, near St. Joseph and Avon.  The community is located along Stearns County Road 4 near 130th Avenue.  Stearns County Road 3 is also in the immediate area.

References

Unincorporated communities in Stearns County, Minnesota
Unincorporated communities in Minnesota